Champions of Rock is a compilation album by the Canadian rock band April Wine, released in 1996 on Disky Records.

Track listing 
All tracks written by Myles Goodwyn unless otherwise noted.
 "Just Between You and Me" – 3:54
 "I Like to Rock" – 4:22
 "Roller" – 4:15
 "This Could be the Right One" – 4:15
 "All Over Town" – 2:59
 "Say Hello" – 2:59
 "Tellin' Me Lies" – 2:59
 "Big City Girls" – 3:40
 "Caught in the Crossfire" – 3:34
 "Crash and Burn" – 2:31
 "One More Time" – 3:55
 "Rock Myself to Sleep" (Kimberley Rew, Vince de la Cruz) – 3:12
 "Bad Boys" – 3:08
 "Money Talks" – 3:27
 "Too Hot to Handle" – 5:05
 "Wanna Rock" – 2:04

Personnel 
 Myles Goodwyn – vocals, guitar, keyboards
 Brian Greenway – guitar, vocals
 Gary Moffet – guitar, background vocals
 Steve Lang – bass, background vocals
 Jean Pellerin – bass (on "Rock Myself to Sleep")
 Jerry Mercer – drums & percussion, background vocals
 Marty Simon – drums (on "Rock Myself to Sleep")
 Daniel Barbe – keyboards (on "Rock Myself to Sleep")

References 

April Wine albums
1996 compilation albums
Albums produced by Myles Goodwyn
Albums produced by Mike Stone (record producer)
Albums produced by Nick Blagona